Flueraş, Flueraș, Fluerash, or Fluieraş may refer to:

 Ioan Flueraș (1882–1952), Romanian politician
 Fluieraş, a Moldovan folk music ensemble; see Maria Bieșu and Nicolae Sulac